Rhodanobacter panaciterrae is a Gram-negative, aerobic, non-spore-forming and non-motile bacterium from the genus of Rhodanobacter which has been isolated from soil from a ginseng field from Liaoning in China.

References

Xanthomonadales
Bacteria described in 2011